Jackson Whistle (born 9 June 1995) is a Canadian-born British professional ice hockey goaltender currently playing for the Belfast Giants of the Elite Ice Hockey League and the British national team. He represented Great Britain at the 2019 IIHF World Championship, 2021 IIHF World Championship and 2022 IIHF World Championship.

Whistle previously played for the Belfast Giants during an earlier spell between 2016 and 2018, before spending one season with both the Sheffield Steelers and Nottingham Panthers.

Playing career

Junior career
Whistle played Atom hockey in the Bracknell Bees system, before moving back to Canada where he played for the Pursuit of Excellence Hockey Academy. He was subsequently selected as the Vancouver Giants fourth round pick in the 2010 WHL Bantam Draft. Before playing with the Giants, Whistle was a member of the Gold Medal winning British Columbia team at the 2011 Canada Winter Games. After his first season with the Giants, in which he played 21 games as back-up to starter Adam Morrison, he was traded for a 3rd round pick in 2014 Bantam Draft to the Kelowna Rockets.

During his first two seasons with the Rockets, Whistle played as back-up to starting goaltender Jordon Cooke. In the 2014–15 WHL season he was named as the team's starting Goaltender. Whistle was named November WHL Goalie of the Month after winning 12 of the team's first 14 games of the season. The run of good form continued all season, culminating in the Rockets winning their fourth WHL Championship by beating the Brandon Wheat Kings 4-0 in the finals. As a result the team qualified for the 2015 Memorial Cup, where they progressed to the final, losing 2-1 in overtime to Oshawa Generals.

Whistle's final season with the Rockets was marred by injury, as he suffered a torn labrum in both hips which resulted in season-ending surgery.

Professional career
Whistle started his professional career in the July 2016, signing with the Belfast Giants of the EIHL, where he served as back-up to long-time incumbent Stephen Murphy.

Whistle acted as the starting goaltender for much of the 2017-18 season, as a result of Stephen Murphy picking up a season ending injury early in the season. Whistle played 44 games for the Giants, posting a 3.38 GAA with a .895 SV%.

Whilst the Giants would finish 5th in the league, and lose in the playoff quarterfinal, they did take home some silverware, winning the Challenge Cup for the 2nd time in their history, beating the Cardiff Devils 6-3 in the final. Following the completion of the campaign, Whistle joined the Sheffield Steelers, signing a 2 year contract.

In his first season with the Steelers Whistle was named starter following the release of Matt Climie, playing in 50 of the team's 60 games during the 2018–19 EIHL season. During this time he posted a posting a 3.20 GAA with a .898 SV% and was named as the EIHL Player of the Week in February, with coach Tom Barrasso describing him as the team's best player. The Steelers would finish the season in 7th place, before losing in the Playoff quarterfinals to the Cardiff Devils.

In July 2019, Whistle made the shock move from Sheffield to their closest rivals Nottingham Panthers.

In July 2021, Whistle rejoined the Belfast Giants ahead of the 2021-22 Elite League season.

International Play
Although born in Canada, Whistle is eligible to play for Great Britain as a result of spending his childhood years in the country. He made his international debut at the 2018 IIHF World Championships, coming in as relief for starter Ben Bowns in a 6-1 loss to Kazakhstan, conceding 1 goal. Despite this loss, Team GB won the rest of their games and gained promotion to the IIHF World Championships for the first time in 25 years.

Whistle once again represented Great Britain at the 2019 IIHF World Championship. As back-up to Bowns he did not start any games, however, he came off the bench in losses to Canada, Denmark and Slovakia, conceding 9 goals across the 3 games. He played three games at the 2021 IIHF World Championship.

Personal life
He is the son of former player and coach David Whistle. His younger brother Brandon also played for the Sheffield Steelers.

Career Statistics

Regular season and playoffs

International

Awards and honours

References

External links
 

1995 births
Living people
Belfast Giants players
British ice hockey goaltenders
Ice hockey people from British Columbia
Kelowna Rockets players
Sheffield Steelers players
Nottingham Panthers players
Sportspeople from Kelowna
Vancouver Giants players
Canadian emigrants to the United Kingdom